Calliostoma connyae is a species of sea snail, a marine gastropod mollusk in the family Calliostomatidae.

Original description
  Poppe G.T., Tagaro S.P. & Vilvens C. (2014) Three new Calliostoma from the Philippines. Visaya 4(2): 49–56. [May 2014] page(s): 51.

References

External links
 Worms Link

connyae